Pursuit is a single-player arcade video game by Kee Games, originally released in 1975. The player plays a World War I flying ace who tries to shoot down enemy planes. Gameplay is from a first person perspective. Pursuit marks the first time Atari Inc. publicly acknowledged its relationship with Kee.

Gameplay
The player uses a flight stick to steer the plane up, down, right, and left to get the enemy in his or her sights. The top-mounted fire button is then used to shoot the enemy plane and gain points.

Release
The game is housed in a custom wide cabinet modeled to look like a World War I biplane cockpit. It includes a similarly modeled flight stick with top-mounted fire button. The game's PCB is composed of discrete technology and includes Atari/Kee's Durastress technology. One overlay provides the onscreen crosshair.

See also
 Red Baron (1980)

References

1975 video games
Arcade video games
Arcade-only video games
Atari arcade games
Combat flight simulators
Discrete video arcade games
Video games developed in the United States